Ede North/Ede South/Egbedore/Ejigbo is a National Assembly constituency in Osun State. The constituency is represented by Bamidele Salam.

It covers the Local Government Areas of Ede South, Ede North, Egbedore and Ejigbo.

Constituencies of the House of Representatives (Nigeria)